Anne Grete Preus (22 May 1957 – 25 August 2019) was a Norwegian rock singer in Norway in the 1980s and 1990s, first as member of the bands Veslefrikk and Can Can and later as a solo act. She released nine solo albums and won the Spellemannprisen multiple times. In 2008 she appeared as a narrator in an Arts Alliance production, id - Identity of the Soul. She contracted liver cancer in 2007. In early 2019 she had to cancel the planned concerts for the summer due to illness.

Awards and honors
 Gammleng Award i åpen klasse i 1992
 Kardemommestipendiet i 1992
 Spellemannprisen 1994 i klassene kvinnelig artist for Millimeter
 Spellemannprisen 1994 i klassen årets album for Millimeter
 Spellemannprisen 1994 i klassen årets hit for Millimeter
 Tekstforfatterfondets ærespris i 2006
 Norsk Artistforbund Ærespris i 2007
 Prøysenprisene i 2007
 Edvardprisen i klassen populærmusikk for albumet Om igjen for første gang

Bibliography
Stråets lengde. Skisser fra et liv ["the length of the straw. Sketches from a life"] (2020, posthumous). The collection of texts by Preus, was written with an autobiography in mind, according to media.

Discography 
 1984: Snart 17 (Transmission)
 1988: Fullmåne  (Warner)
 1989: Lav Sol! Høy Himmel (Warner)
 1991: Og Høsten Kommer Tidsnok (Warner)
 1994: Millimeter (Warner)
 1994: Anne Grete Preus (Warner)
 1996: Millimeter (Warner)
 1996: Vrimmel (Warner)
 1999: Verden Er Et Vakkert Sted (Virgin Music)
 2001: Alfabet (Warner)
 2004: Når Dagen Roper  (Worner)
 2007: Om Igjen For Første Gang (Warner)
 2009: Nesten Alene (Warner)
 2013: Et Sted Å Feste Blikket (Warner)

References

1957 births
2019 deaths
Musicians from Haugesund
Norwegian women singers
Norwegian women guitarists
Norwegian multi-instrumentalists
Spellemannprisen winners
Deaths from liver cancer
Deaths from cancer in Norway